Vasil Kaloyanov (born 13 July 1988) is a Bulgarian football player, currently playing as a forward for Septemvri Simitli.

Career
In July 2017 he joined  Septemvri Sofia.

On 24 July 2018, Kaloyanov signed with Tsarsko Selo.

Awards
 Champion of B PFG 2013 (with Neftochimic Burgas)

References

External links

Living people
1988 births
Sportspeople from Burgas
Bulgarian footballers
Association football forwards
PFC Chernomorets Burgas players
FC Chernomorets Burgas players
FC Pomorie players
PFC Svetkavitsa players
Neftochimic Burgas players
PFC Slavia Sofia players
FC Botev Vratsa players
FC Sozopol players
FC Vereya players
FC Septemvri Sofia players
FC Chernomorets Balchik players
FC Tsarsko Selo Sofia players
FC Sportist Svoge players
FC Septemvri Simitli players
First Professional Football League (Bulgaria) players
Second Professional Football League (Bulgaria) players